The 2022 European Rally Championship is the 70th season of the FIA European Rally Championship, the European continental championship series in rallying. The season is also the ninth following the merge between the European Rally Championship and the Intercontinental Rally Challenge.
Andreas Mikkelsen was the reigning champion. Javier Pardo Siota is the reigning champion of ERC 2, now renamed as ERC Open, while Jean-Baptiste Franceschi is the reigning champion of ERC 3 - now renamed as ERC 4.

Efrén Llarena won the championship before 2022 Barum Czech Rally Zlín, using a Ŝkoda Fabia Rally2 evo prepared by Team MRF Tyres.

Competitions 

 FIA ERC: Main open championship for all current FIA-homologated cars within sporting classes RC2 to RC5, with Rally2 cars the leading contenders.
 FIA ERC3: Second tier, specifically for the Rally3 class.
 FIA ERC4: Third ERC tier, the first for front-wheel-drive cars. Allows Rally4, Rally5, R3 (Group R) and Group A cars.
 FIA ERC4 Junior: For drivers aged 27 and under on 1 January 2022 in Rally4 and Rally5 cars on Pirelli control tyres. Also called 'ERC Junior' by the promotor, this championship will not be contested over the first two rounds.
 FIA European Rally Championship for Teams: each team can nominate a maximum of three cars (from all categories), counting the two highest-placed cars from each team.
 ERC Open: for the cars formerly used in ERC-2, including N4, Rally2-Kit and RGT classes. This championship is organised by ERC Promotor Gmbh and is not an official FIA title, therefore entry into either ERC or ERC Open does not expressively qualify for entry into the other, unlike ERC3 or ERC4 for example.
 Clio Trophy by Toksport WRT: competition with six rounds of the ERC with Renault Clio Rally5 as the vehicle of choice. The winner receives the ability to contest 3 events from ERC 2023 season behind the wheel of a Renault Clio Rally4.

Calendar 

The 2022 season is set to contested over eight rounds across Central, Northern and Southern Europe.

Entries

ERC

ERC Open

ERC3

ERC4

Results and standings

Season summary

Scoring system 

Points for final position are awarded as in the following table in ERC, ERC3, ERC4 and ERC Open. In ERC, ERC3 and ERC4, the best seven scores from the eight rounds count towards the final number of points.

There are also five bonus points awarded to the winners of the Power Stage, four points for second place, three for third, two for fourth and one for fifth. Power Stage points are awarded in the drivers', co-drivers' and manufacturers' championships.

Drivers' Championships

ERC

ERC3

ERC4

ERC4 Junior

ERC Open

Clio Trophy by Toksport WRT

Co-drivers' championships

ERC

Teams' championship

Notes

References

External links
ERC 2022: What has changed?

European Rally Championship seasons
European Rally
Rally